Hoplangia is a genus of cnidarians belonging to the family Caryophylliidae.

The species of this genus are found in Central and Southern Europe.

Species:
 Hoplangia durotrix Gosse, 1860

References

Caryophylliidae
Scleractinia genera